RH (formerly Restoration Hardware) is an upscale American home-furnishings company headquartered in Corte Madera, California. The company sells its merchandise through its retail stores, catalog, and online. As of August 2018, the company operated a total of 70 galleries, 18 full-line design galleries, and 6 baby-and-child galleries. The company also has 36 outlet stores in the United States and Canada.

History

Stephen Gordon founded Restoration Hardware in Eureka, California, in 1979 while restoring a Victorian home and finding affordable, high-quality hardware and fixtures unavailable. The company expanded slowly in Northern California and Boston before raising outside capital from Cardinal Investments which allowed it to accelerate its expansion.  The company had 47 stores when it went public in 1998, ending the year at over 65 stores. It then expanded to over 100 stores in 31 states, with $369.5 million in net sales by 2001.    

In 2001, Gary Friedman joined the company from Williams-Sonoma, Inc. as Chief Executive Officer after being passed over for the CEO position at Williams-Sonoma by Howard Lester. Restoration Hardware's sales were waning and the company was seeking additional capital. In 2005, Gordon left the company in order to take over as CEO of Robert Redford's Sundance Catalog Company. In 2007, Sears Holdings Corporation purchased 13.7% of the share of Restoration Hardware, prompting speculation that Sears might attempt a full takeover. After the United States housing bubble burst, the company was slated to close two stores in 2008, including the original store located in Old Town Eureka, and open one in Canada. In June 2008, the company completed the transaction without Sears Holding, but instead with Catterton Partners.

Catterton took Restoration Holdings private on June 18, 2008. That year, the company also launched its baby-and-child line. In 2012, Restoration Hardware underwent an initial public offering, trading at $24 a share at its opening. The company was renamed RH, and trades on the New York Stock Exchange under the symbol RH. In 2007, about 65% of the company's products were made outside the US, particularly from contract manufacturers in southern China. The company is the largest importer of Belgian Linen and Italian bedding in the United States.

RH created a small spaces line in 2012, composed of furnishings scaled down for smaller living spaces. The 2014 Small Spaces source book depicts 18 different smaller-scale homes in the United States and Europe. In 2013, RH also released the Objects of Curiosity source book, showing character pieces, artifacts, and unique décor. The tableware line was released in 2013.

In 2012, the company was accused of copying the designs of other companies, specifically those used for the US military. On March 7, 2013, RH opened a gallery in Boston's Back Bay in an 1864 brick and brownstone structure at 234 Berkeley Street. In May 2013, the company announced a multichannel RH contemporary art platform when it acquired the first edition of Rain Room by Random International with exclusive showing rights in North America. RH loaned Rain Room to the Museum of Modern Art in New York for the U.S. premier of EXPO 1: New York from mid-May through July 2013. In 2014, RH opened a 70,000 square foot store which Atlanta Magazine called RH's "next-generation full-line design gallery", which includes amenities like a 50-foot infinite pool.

RH operates six stores in Canada: one full-line design gallery at Yorkdale Shopping Centre in Toronto, three galleries and two outlets.

In February 2023, it was reported that D1 Capital Partners owns 7.4% of RH.

Source books
Time magazine was critical of the company for its large catalog called the "Source Book" for its length (992 pages), specifically its waste of paper. The full 2014 catalogue weighed 17 lbs and had over 3000 pages. The company stated that by combining all of the different sourcebooks into one package it reduced their carbon footprint, while critics still stated that the volume of paper used for the publication's mass delivery was wasteful.

Design philosophy

As of September 2010, company representatives declared a change in focus for the company. In an attempt to go further "up-market", the company has focused itself on furniture gallery offerings at higher price points to distinguish itself from competitors like Pottery Barn. Locations have begun adding the term "Gallery" to their marques to indicate the change. The company designs, markets, and sells its collections through its retail stores, source books, and online. The San Francisco Chronicle has reported that, "One of the key strategies that set RH apart is its approach to inventory. While most retailers design things in-house, RH created a different model. "We have one full-time designer, Suzi Bolognese, working directly from London on our catalogs and displays" [its CEO] Friedman said. "We find artists we love and 'curate' [the client]."" The company has partnered with artisans and designers in the production of its lines. Jim Cramer of CNBC stated that source books were a tactic to move past the "four walls of the web" and to make it "exciting for people to shop again". He also stated that RH is a market disruptor, often to the point that it "disrupts itself". In a different piece, Cramer stated that the company was reinventing the concept of the brick and mortar store, including the use of very large flagship stores in unusual locations.

Restaurants
RH operates 14 restaurants inside of some RH Gallery locations in addition to one standalone location.
 San Francisco, California
 New York, New York
 Yountville, California
 Corte Madera, California
 Jacksonville, Florida
 West Palm Beach, Florida
 Dallas, Texas
 Columbus, Ohio
 Chicago, Illinois
 Charlotte, North Carolina
 Nashville, Tennessee
 Toronto, Ontario
 Oak Brook, Illinois
 Edina, Minnesota

Executives
Gary Friedman was the company's chairman and co-chief executive officer from 2001 until his resignation in 2012 following an independent report from Weil, Gotshal & Manges into his inappropriate romantic relationship with a younger female employee. Following his dismissal,  Friedman continued the relationship with the woman. He was reappointed as co-CEO and chairman in July 2013. The company also announced that concurrent with Friedman's appointment, RH acquired the exclusive right to develop Hierarchy and that the new concept would be rebranded as RH Atelier, focusing on the development of luxury apparel, accessories, footwear, and jewelry.

Carlos Alberini joined as co-CEO in 2010, but resigned in 2013 to accept a position as CEO of Lucky Brand Jeans, upon which Friedman became the chairman and CEO of the company.

References

External links

1979 establishments in California
Companies based in Marin County, California
American companies established in 1979
Retail companies established in 1979
Furniture retailers of the United States
Corte Madera, California
Home decor retailers
Companies listed on the New York Stock Exchange
Retail companies based in California
2008 mergers and acquisitions
2012 initial public offerings
1998 initial public offerings
Luxury brands